"N.W.O." (New World Order) is a song by American industrial metal band Ministry, released as the opening track and second single from their fifth studio album Psalm 69: The Way to Succeed and the Way to Suck Eggs (1992). An industrial metal song, it was co-written and co-produced by the band’s frontman Al Jourgensen and bassist Paul Barker, and is widely regarded as a protest against then-President George H. W. Bush, featuring samples from his speeches. The song was nominated for a Grammy Award under the Best Metal Performance category in 1993, and was featured in the soundtrack album of Ralph Bakshi’s 1992 film Cool World. In 1994, the song was used in a Spin Magazine commercial which featured Jourgensen, among others. In 2015, "N.W.O." was ranked #10 in the VH1 "Top 10 Hardest Hitting Heavy Metal Political Anthems" list.

The promotional single, featuring two mixes of "N.W.O." and a non-album instrumental track "Fucked", was released around the same time as its parent album and topped out on the Billboard Alternative Airplay chart Alternative Airplay chart at no. 11.

The music video for “N.W.O.” was directed by Peter Christopherson. The majority of the video is a mix of police beatings, riots, and gunfights. It also includes a scene in which a woman dressed as the Statue of Liberty is beaten by police in a manner similar to the famous amateur video of Rodney King being beaten by police. The video was featured on Beavis and Butt-Head along with another track from Psalm 69, "Just One Fix".

The song was featured in the video game Need for Speed: The Run.

Samples
Samples from Apocalypse Now are included in this track: Dennis Hopper's character exclaiming "It's alright!" as the patrol boat is approaching the colonel's fort, as well as the siren that was used during the scene. There is also a loop of the guitar solo coming from a transistor radio in the grenade launcher's bunker.

Footage from the music video of the Octopus is from the Japanese film Space Amoeba. Footage of the turtle is from the film franchise Gamera.

Track listing

Personnel
Credits adapted from the liner notes of the “N.W.O.” single, Psalm 69: The Way to Succeed and the Way to Suck Eggs and Greatest Fits.
 Al Jourgensen – vocals and guitars on “N.W.O.”, programming, production
 Paul Barker – bass guitar on “N.W.O.”, programming, production
 Bill Rieflin – drums on “N.W.O.”
 Howie Beno – programming, editing
 Paul Manno – remix engineer
 Paul Elledge – cover design

Charts

References

External links

1992 singles
Ministry (band) songs
Protest songs
1992 songs
Sire Records singles
Warner Records singles
Songs written by Al Jourgensen
Songs written by Paul Barker
Song recordings produced by Al Jourgensen